Winston Arthur Foster (born 1 November 1941) is an English former professional footballer. He played more than 150 games in the top two divisions of the Football League for Birmingham City.

Born in South Yardley, Birmingham, Foster joined Birmingham City as a junior, making his first-team debut at the age of 19 as a full back. For the next three seasons he played occasionally for the first team either at full back or as Trevor Smith's deputy at centre-half, most notably in the first leg of the 1961 Inter-Cities Fairs Cup Final against A.S. Roma. When Smith sustained the injury that resulted in him leaving the club, Foster took over at centre half and kept his place for another couple of seasons. He was used less frequently in his last two years at the club, and spent three months on loan at Crewe Alexandra before making a permanent move to Plymouth Argyle where he ended his Football League career. He went on to play for Chelmsford City and Bromsgrove Rovers, and spent one season as Bromsgrove's assistant manager.

Honours
Birmingham City
 Inter-Cities Fairs Cup runners-up: 1960–61

Notes

References
General
 
 
 
Specific

1941 births
Living people
Footballers from Birmingham, West Midlands
English footballers
Association football defenders
Birmingham City F.C. players
Crewe Alexandra F.C. players
Plymouth Argyle F.C. players
Chelmsford City F.C. players
Bromsgrove Rovers F.C. players
English Football League players